Emergency Government Headquarters is the name given for a system of nuclear fallout shelters built by the Government of Canada in the 1950s and 1960s as part of continuity of government planning at the height of the Cold War.  Situated at strategic locations across the country, the largest of these shelters are popularly referred to as "Diefenbunkers", a nickname coined by federal opposition politicians during the early 1960s. The nickname was derived from the last name of the Prime Minister of the day, John Diefenbaker, who authorized their construction. Over fifty facilities were built along several designs for various classes of service.

Most of these facilities were built, often in great secrecy, at rural locations outside major cities across Canada.  The majority of the larger facilities were two-story underground bunkers while the largest at CFS Carp had four floors; these facilities were designed to withstand a near-miss from a nuclear explosion. Each underground facility had entrances through massive blast doors at the surface, as well as extensive air filters and positive air pressure to prevent radiation infiltration. Underground storage was built for food, fuel, fresh water, and other supplies for the facilities which were capable of supporting several dozen people for a period of several weeks.  The facilities were operated by personnel from the Royal Canadian Corps of Signals, renamed to Communications Command after the 1968 unification of the Canadian Armed Forces.

Terminology

Facilities

Decommissioning and legacy
Following the end of the Cold War, all but one of the Diefenbunkers have been decommissioned and either covered over, demolished or sold.  Only the facility located at CFB Valcartier remains in use, as an itinerant accommodations barracks.

The two Diefenbunkers which members of the public may visit are located at former CFS Carp in Ontario and CFS Debert.  CFS Carp was decommissioned in 1994 and has been converted into a year-round museum dedicated to the history of the Cold War.  CFS Debert in Nova Scotia was open for tours for the decade following its closure in 1994 as part of a local military museum.  It was later used for summer accommodations for an air cadet gliding school.  In 2009, it was sold and then resold for use as a secure data storage facility.  In 2018, CFS Debert reopened to the public, featuring historical tours, escape rooms, laser tag, special events, and more.  In 2019, the present owner of the Diefenbunker at former CFS Debert purchased the neighbouring NATO building.  The plans for the NATO building are currently unknown.

The Diefenbunker that was located at former CFS Penhold in Alberta was decommissioned in 1994. It was sold to a pair of businessmen from Red Deer in 1995 for CA$472,000. Members of the Hells Angels, a criminal outlaw motorcycle gang, in addition to a group of white supremacists and a car theft group from Miami, were also rumored to have been interested in purchasing the bunker; the businessmen later claimed the Hells Angels had offered them CA$1.3 million for it. However, the government repurchased the building in 1998 for CA$1.25 million (equivalent to $ million in ) in addition to $100,000 in disbursement fees due to potential security risks; they had the shelter demolished in 2001.

A Toronto Star report in February 2020 discussed another nuclear bunker, intended for the politicians of Toronto, Ontario, built during the Cuban Missile Crisis. Located in a home on Old Yonge St. in Aurora, Ontario and still in place, this concrete-reinforced room was intended "to serve as a control centre to house Toronto politicians and emergency personnel in the event of a nuclear attack". According to the report, the bunker includes maps, status boards for recording casualties, one hundred telephone lines, water tanks and an escape route.

In popular culture

The film The Sum of All Fears has a scene that was shot on location in the Diefenbunker at former CFS Carp. The scene consisted of the President of the United States, James Cromwell, and his political advisors performing a war game scenario.

The finale of the second season of The Amazing Race Canada featured a task completed at the Diefenbunker at former CFS Carp.  One member of each team had to search among the bunker's vast array of rooms for three of five hidden souvenirs: a helicopter, a tank, a jeep, a plane, and a compass.

References

See also
Canada in the Cold War

References
 Bruce Forsyth's Canadian Military History Page
 The Grey and Simcoe Foresters

External links
The Diefenbunker Cold War Museum
 History of the Canadian Forces Museums 1919-2004
 The CBC archives video of inside the Diefenbunker at CFS Carp

Cold War history of Canada
Military of Canada
Nuclear bunkers in Canada
Emergency management in Canada
Government of Canada
Continuity of government
Secret places